Nils Hülphers, sometimes transcribed Hylphert (1712—1776), was a Swedish mayor of Hedemora (1760), and member of the Riksdag of Sweden (1755—1756, 1765—1770).

Nils Hülphers was the grandson of :sv:Nils Rabenius and cousin of Abraham Hülphers the Older. Hülphers married Katarina Westman in 1745.

References

Members of the Riksdag of the Estates
Mayors of places in Sweden
1712 births
1776 deaths
People from Hedemora
18th-century Swedish politicians